The Nadym River Bridge is a combined single-level bridge that was opened on September 11, 2015. It is located simultaneously on the Surgut – Salekhard highway and on the Salekhard – Nadym – Korotchaevo railway line. It is an element of the Northern Latitudinal Railway that will connect the Arctic with the center of Russia and the Urals .

The total length of the passage is 3.1 km, including the bridge itself (1334 m) and access areas (1770 m). The length of the superstructure is 110 m. The start of construction is 2011, the opening of the road crossing is 2015. The construction of the railway part of the bridge was postponed..

The construction companies that participated in the construction of the bridge are OJSC Mostostroy-11 , CJSC Kurganstalmost , and LLC Urengoydorstroy

Notes 

Road-rail bridges
Geography of Yamalo-Nenets Autonomous Okrug

Railway bridges in Russia
Road bridges in Russia